Richard Erle-Drax-Grosvenor may refer to:

Richard Erle-Drax-Grosvenor (1762–1819), British MP
Richard Erle-Drax-Grosvenor (1797–1828), British MP, son of the above